The Botanical Garden is an interchange metro station in Noida between the Blue Line and Magenta Line of the Delhi Metro. It serves as one of the terminal stations of the Magenta line.

The station

Structure
Botanical Garden metro station is the first elevated interchange station outside Delhi situated on the Blue Line and Magenta Line of Delhi Metro.

Station layout

Facilities

ATMs: The station has a Punjab National Bank ATM.

Eating Joints: The station has 2 kiosks inside the concourse area, Munch with Ava and Food Track.

Connections

Bus
Delhi Transport Corporation bus routes number 33, 33A, 33EXT, 34, 34A, 319, 319A, 323, 347, 347A, 443, 443A and 491 serve the station.

In addition, the Yamuna Expressway Industrial Development Authority (YEIDA) runs the "Yamuna Sarthi" bus service connecting Noida, Greater Noida and the Yamuna Expressway Industrial Development Authority (YEIDA) areas. It consists of CNG semi-low-floor buses, each with a capacity of 50 passengers, running from the Botanical Garden Metro station to Sector 22D in YEIDA area. The buses traverse a circular route covering 13 bus stops, including Botanical Garden Metro station, Great India Place Mall, Amity University, ATS Village in Sector 93A, KPMG, Kondli, Pari Chowk, Parasvnath P3, YEIDA office, Gautam Buddha University, Galgotia University, Dankaur and Sector 22D of the YEIDA area.

There are also some private Force Traveller operators that ply between the station and Pari Chowk, Greater Noida.

Entry/Exit

Gallery

See also

Delhi
List of Delhi Metro stations
Transport in Delhi
Delhi Metro Rail Corporation
Delhi Suburban Railway
Delhi Monorail
Delhi Transport Corporation
Uttar Pradesh
Noida
National Capital Region (India)
List of rapid transit systems
List of metro systems

References

External links

 Delhi Metro Rail Corporation Ltd. (Official site) 
 Delhi Metro Annual Reports
 
 UrbanRail.Net – descriptions of all metro systems in the world, each with a schematic map showing all stations.

Delhi Metro stations
Railway stations opened in 2009
Railway stations in Gautam Buddh Nagar district